Madonna is a 2015 South Korean mystery-drama film written and directed by Shin Su-won. It was screened in the Un Certain Regard section of the 2015 Cannes Film Festival. Kwon So-hyun won Best New Actress at the 35th Korean Association of Film Critics Awards.

Plot
Due to her mounting bills, Moon Hye-rim becomes a nurse's aide and is assigned to the VIP ward to take care of a patient who has been left paralyzed by a stroke, Kim Cheol-oh. Cheol-oh is a billionaire tycoon and the hospital's major investor, and for ten years his unscrupulous son Sang-woo has done everything in his power to extend his father's life through a series of organ transplants because Cheol-oh had instructed in his will that his entire fortune is to be given to charities (thereby putting an end to Sang-woo's affluent lifestyle). One day, a brain-dead, pregnant young woman named Jang Mi-na is brought to the hospital after a mysterious car crash. In exchange for a sum of money, Hye-rim agrees to Sang-woo's instructions that she track down Mi-na's next-of-kin and get them to sign an organ donation consent form for her heart. As Hye-rim delves into Mi-na's past and discovers that Mi-na was bullied since childhood for her hair color, weight and poverty, to her adulthood as a sexually abused factory worker who becomes a prostitute named "Madonna," the more Hye-rim forms a strange bond with her comatose patient and becomes determined to derail the heart transplant.

Cast
Seo Young-hee as Moon Hye-rim
Kwon So-hyun as Jang Mi-na
Kim Young-min as Kim Sang-woo
Ko Seo-hee as Go Hyeon-joo
Yoo Soon-chul as Kim Cheol-oh, the Chairman
Ye Soo-jung as Foul-mouthed old woman
Shin Woon-sub as Dr. Han
Byun Yo-han as Dr. Im Hyeok-gyu
Lee Myung-haeng as Sales team manager Park
Kim Jo-jung as Pimp
Han Song-hee as Mi-young
Lee Sang-hee as Ah-ram
Park Hyun-young as Joon-hee
Jin Yong-wook as Jong-dae
Kim Hyun-sook as Mi-na's grandmother
Susanna Noh as Teacher Choi
Kim Jeong-yeon as young Mi-na
Park Ji-young as younger Choi
Choi Hee-jin as Coffee shop owner

Awards and nominations

References

External links

2015 films
2010s mystery drama films
South Korean mystery drama films
2010s Korean-language films
2015 drama films
2010s South Korean films